Bill Purdy (born June 26, 1946) is an American rower. He competed in the men's coxed four event at the 1968 Summer Olympics.

References

1946 births
Living people
American male rowers
Olympic rowers of the United States
Rowers at the 1968 Summer Olympics
Sportspeople from Chicago